Aodh mac Diarmada Mac an Bhaird, Irish poet,   1200–1600.

Aodh was a member of the Mac an Bhaird bardic family of County Galway and County Donegal.

Only one extant poem Le héanmhnaoi cuirthear clú ban, has been safely attributed to Aodh. It begins:

Le héanmhnaoi cuirthear clú ban
a clú ó choimmeas ga cur;
ní ríomh do-chóidh ar a crodh;
i ndíol sgol is dóigh a dhul.

It mentions the MacMahon of Airgialla which may indicate personal knowledge of the clan and kingdom.

References

 Dioghluim Dána Láimhbheartach Mac Cionnaith Lambert McKenna (ed), Dublin, Oifig an tSoláthair [Government Publication Office], 1938, pp. 415–419
 The Surnames of Ireland, Edward MacLysaght, 1978.

External links
 

Medieval Irish poets
Year of death unknown
Year of birth unknown
Irish male poets
Irish-language writers